"Devils You Know" is the fourth episode of the third season of the American television series Agents of S.H.I.E.L.D., based on the Marvel Comics organization S.H.I.E.L.D. (Strategic Homeland Intervention, Enforcement and Logistics Division), revolving around the character of Phil Coulson and his team of S.H.I.E.L.D. agents as they work with a rival organization to hunt Inhumans. It is set in the Marvel Cinematic Universe (MCU), sharing continuity with the films of the franchise. The episode was written by Paul Zbyszewski, and directed by Ron Underwood.

Clark Gregg reprises his role as Coulson from the film series, and is joined by series regulars Ming-Na Wen, Brett Dalton, Chloe Bennet, Iain De Caestecker, Elizabeth Henstridge, Nick Blood, Adrianne Palicki, and Henry Simmons. The visual effects for guest star Chad Lindberg's Inhuman character's abilities were provided by FuseFX.

"Devils You Know" originally aired on ABC on October 20, 2015, and according to Nielsen Media Research, was watched by 3.85 million viewers.

Plot 
Veteran Inhuman Alisha tracks down some old friends from Afterlife, Shane and Lori Henson, with the aim to recruit them into the Secret Warriors. Alisha sends a duplicate to Shane and Lori, learning they received an email from someone wanting to reunite the Afterlife Inhumans. The monstrous Inhuman Lash attacks and kills Shane, Lori, and the duplicate, traumatising the real Alisha. Daisy and Mack pursue Lash, while Coulson alerts Price, who sends an ATCU team to help, but they are unable to apprehend the Inhuman. Daisy finds a virus in the email sent to the Hensons, and reluctantly share this with the ATCU, who have found dead Inhumans in the past who received the email, but failed to notice the virus. She traces the virus back to IT technician Dwight Frye.

Kebo tells Hunter that Ward wants his help for a planned Hydra attack. Hunter tells May that as soon as he gets close enough, he will kill Ward. Coulson and Andrew are stunned when May arrives at the Playground to voice her concerns about Hunter, believing he is too personally involved in his mission, fixated on avenging Ward's attempted murder of Morse. She agrees to contact Coulson when Hunter knows where he is meeting Ward, so a SHIELD team can arrive to assist them against Hydra. Andrew apologises to May for breaking up with her and offers to explain, but she is uninterested, believing herself to be the problem.

Coulson, Daisy, Mack, Price and an ATCU team go to Frye's apartment, discovering he is an Inhuman whose health deteriorates in close proximity to other Inhumans. He explains that he gets better every time Lash claims another victim, and that Lash gave him the names of the Afterlife Inhumans and asked him to track them down. Coulson convinces Price to let Daisy and Mack join the ATCU team taking Frye into custody, so they can see what the organisation are doing with the Inhumans they apprehend. En route their truck is attacked by Lash, and Daisy's use of her powers against him flips the truck, injuring her and knocking Mack and the ATCU agents unconscious. Lash kills Frye but spares Daisy, and as he is leaving she sees his shadow change into a more human shape, realising he is able to transform between human and bestial appearances.

Kebo takes Hunter to a Hydra warehouse, where he promptly tries to kill Ward, leading to a shootout with almost a dozen Hydra agents. May joins the fight, at which point Ward reveals he has sent Hydra agents, including Werner von Strucker, to kill Andrew at a gas station, offering to call them off if May and Hunter surrender. Hunter refuses and chases Ward, managing to shoot him in the shoulder before he escapes with Kebo, and May contacts Coulson to warn him that Andrew is in danger. Meanwhile, Werner flees the gas station as it is destroyed in an explosion.

Fitz finds Simmons has compiled a file regarding the Monolith, but she initially refuses to explain why. She later relents and tells Fitz of her plans to return to Maveth, wanting his help to rebuild the Monolith, and offers to recount her experience on the planet.

Production

Development 
In October 2015, Marvel announced that the fourth episode of the season would be titled "Devils You Know", to be written by Paul Zbyszewski, with Ron Underwood directing.

Casting 

In October 2015, Marvel revealed that main cast members Clark Gregg, Ming-Na Wen, Brett Dalton, Chloe Bennet, Iain De Caestecker, Elizabeth Henstridge, Nick Blood, Adrianne Palicki, Henry Simmons, and Luke Mitchell would star as Phil Coulson, Melinda May, Grant Ward, Daisy Johnson, Leo Fitz, Jemma Simmons, Lance Hunter, Bobbi Morse, Alphonso "Mack" MacKenzie, and Lincoln Campbell, respectively. It was also revealed that the guest cast for the episode would include Blair Underwood as Andrew Garner, Constance Zimmer as Rosalind Price, Matthew Willig as Lash, Daz Crawford as Kebo, Andrew Howard as Banks, Spencer Treat Clark as Alexander, Alicia Vela-Bailey as Alisha, Alexi Wasser as Lori, Nick Eversman as Shane and Chad Lindberg as Dwight Frye. Crawford and Vela-Bailey did not receive guest star credit in the episode. Underwood, Zimmer, Willig, Crawford, Howard, Clark, and Vela-Bailey reprise their roles from earlier in the series. Despite being credited, Mitchell did not ultimately appear.

Visual effects 
The Inhuman character of Dwight Frye "breaks out in a rash" when he nears another Inhuman. Though the rash was created through make-up and prosthetics, the appearance of it on Frye's face was done digitally. Visual effects supervisor Mark Kolpack noted that since the character was killed by the end of the episode it was not cost effective to have actor Lindberg professionally laser scanned; instead an Occipital Structure Sensor attached to Kolpack's iPad Air 2 was used to get a scan of Lindberg's face and make-up, a process that Kolpack admitted was not yet perfect. Kolpack was able to use the scan to get textures and geometry ahead of having lead visual effects vendor FuseFX create the final rash effect.

Broadcast 
"Devils You Know" was first aired in the United States on ABC on October 20, 2015.

Reception

Ratings 
In the United States the episode received a 1.5/4 percent share among adults between the ages of 18 and 49, meaning that it was seen by 1.5 percent of all households, and 4 percent of all of those watching television at the time of the broadcast. It was watched by 3.85 million viewers.

References

External links 
"Devils You Know" at ABC

Agents of S.H.I.E.L.D. (season 3) episodes
2015 American television episodes